Vincenzo Napoli (died 1648) was a Roman Catholic prelate who served as Bishop of Patti (1609–1648).

Biography
On 2 December 1609, Vincenzo Napoli was appointed during the papacy of Pope Paul V as Bishop of Patti.
On 6 December 1609, he was consecrated bishop by Giovanni Garzia Mellini, Bishop of Imola, with Lucio de Morra, Archbishop of Otranto, and Antonio Albergati, Bishop of Bisceglie, serving as co-consecrators. 
He served as Bishop of Patti until his death on 23 August 1648.

While bishop, he was the principal co-consecrator of Dionysius O'Driscoll, Archbishop of Brindisi (1640); and Marcello Stella, Bishop of Isernia (1640).

References

External links and additional sources
 (for Chronology of Bishops) 
 (for Chronology of Bishops) 

17th-century Roman Catholic bishops in Sicily
Bishops appointed by Pope Paul V
1648 deaths